Saint-Joseph-de-la-Pointe-De Lévy is a district (secteur) within the Desjardins borough of the city of Lévis, Quebec.

Prior to its 2002 merger into the city of Lévis, it was a parish municipality, whose name was written as Saint-Joseph-de-la-Pointe-de-Lévy.  It was also more colloquially known as Saint-Joseph-de-Lévis.

Population: 1,141 (2006)

References

Neighbourhoods in Lévis, Quebec
Former municipalities in Quebec
Populated places disestablished in 2002